Novak Djokovic defeated Mardy Fish in the final, 6–2, 3–6, 6–4 to win the men's singles tennis title at the 2011 Canadian Open. It was his 10th career Masters title, and he became the first man to win five Masters titles in the same year.

Andy Murray was the two-time defending champion, but lost to Kevin Anderson in the second round.

Seeds
The top eight seeds receive a bye into the second round.

Qualifying

Main draw

Finals

Top half

Section 1

Section 2

Bottom half

Section 3

Section 4

References
Main Draw

Rogers Cup
2011 Rogers Cup